Kosta Glasbruk, later known as Kosta Boda, is a Swedish glassmaking company (glasbruk in Swedish) founded by two foreign officers in Charles XII's army, Anders Koskull and Georg Bogislaus Staël von Holstein, in 1742. The name is a portmanteau of the founders' surnames, Ko(skull) + Sta(el). It is located in Kosta, Sweden, which was named for the company. The surrounding region has become known as the "Kingdom of Crystal" and is now a tourist site which attracts a million visitors annually.

History

Early production consisted of window glass, chandeliers and drinking glasses. From the 1840s, the factory was at the forefront of new trends and technical developments, producing pressed glass, and in the 1880s setting up a new glass-cutting workshop.

In 1903, the company merged with the Reijmyre glassworks but both retained their own names and Kosta went on to maintain its reputation as one of the leading Swedish manufacturers with a range of fine art glass and tableware by distinguished designers such as Vicke Lindstrand, artistic director from 1950-1973.

Having merged with Boda Glasbruk in Emmaboda Municipality, Kosta Glasbruk is still active today under the name of Kosta Boda.

Gallery

Notes and references

External links
Company official website
A company entry at Illinois State Museum

Glassmaking companies of Sweden
1742 establishments in Sweden
Companies established in 1742
Värend
Companies based in Kronoberg County
Museums in Kronoberg County
Industry museums in Sweden
Purveyors to the Court of Sweden